The Secretary for Public Administration, Education and Youth was a bureau secretary in the Portuguese administration in Macau. The Secretary headed the Secretariat for Public Administration, Education and Youth, which was responsible for the civil service, education and youth affairs in the colony. The department's civil service section was reassigned to the Secretariat for Administration and Justice, while the youth and education affairs section was given to the Secretariat for Social Affairs and Culture following the handover.

List of responsibilities
 Civil Service
 Education and Youth Affairs Bureau
 Macau Sports Development Board
 Tertiary Education Services Office
 University of Macau
 Macau Polytechnic Institute

List of Secretariats
 Dr. Jorge Alberto Hagedorn Rangel - Secretary 
 Ho Ven On - Assistant Secretary

References
 Casa de Macau - references to former Portuguese secretaries

Government departments and agencies of Macau
Members of the Executive Council of Macau
Political office-holders in Macau
Positions of the Macau Government
1999 disestablishments in Macau
Education in Macau
Macau